Anthony Liveris (born 2 February 1992) is an Australian businessman and CEO of the biotechnology incubator, Proto Axiom. He is the son of former CEO and chairman of The Dow Chemical Company Andrew Liveris.

Early life and education 

Liveris studied at the University of Pennsylvania, where he was Vice President of the university's College Republicans chapter. During a push to normalise same-sex relations across Ivy-league universities, Liveris said, "A true conservative should endorse empowering Americans to marry whom they love, not limit them." While studying, Liveris cofound the data-analytics firm, Applecart, where Ari Emaneul's Endeavor is now a leading investor. He went on to study at St. Antony's College at the University of Oxford.

Career 

Liveris was appointed CEO of Proto Axiom in May of 2022. The biotechnology firm has announced partnerships with David A. Sinclair, Catalio Capital Management, and Corrs Chambers Westgarth CEO Gavin MacLaren, among others. The company has so far announced $10 million in funding.

Liveris briefly worked for Andrew Forrest's Fortescue Future Initiative.  

Political affiliations

Liveris has worked for Senator Mitt Romney's 2012 Presidential campaign, Tony Blair's Africa Governance Initiative and for former Liberal Prime Minister Malcolm Turnbull. In 2019, Liveris attended the U.S. State Dinner in honour of then Australian Prime Minister Scott Morrison. Following the Australian Federal election of 2022, Liveris pusblished a piece for the Australian Financial Review critical of Senator Amanda Stoker's views on the election.

References 

1992 births
Living people
21st-century Australian businesspeople
University of Pennsylvania alumni
College Republicans
Alumni of St Antony's College, Oxford